Mürefte (formerly Myriophyton; , or Miriofito) is a village in the district of Şarköy, Turkey, on the Sea of Marmara about 51 km southwest of Tekirdağ. After the population exchange some Megleno-Romanian families were settled.

The early history of this town is not known. We find it mentioned for the first time in connection with an earthquake which destroyed it in the year 1063. It was visited by John Cantacuzene about 1350.

Ecclesiastical history
The original diocese was in Thracia Prima, a suffragan of Heraclea Perinthos.

A diocese of Peristatis (modern Şarköy) was established by 1170. The see was later transferred to Myriophyton, and renamed Peristasis and Myriophyton, mentioned first in a Notitia episcopatuum of the end of the fifteenth century.  In the sixteenth century Myriophytum displaced Peristasis, and the diocese took the name of Myriophyturn and Peristasis.

According to the Ottoman population statistics of 1914, the kaza of Mürefte had a total population of 16,876, consisting of 14.146 Greeks and 2.730 Muslims.

The Greek Orthodox diocese became in January 1909 an autocephalous metropolitan see, the Metropolitanate of Myriophyton and Peristasis. The Orthodox population of the metropolitanate was evacuated in October 1922, just before the Greek-Turkish population exchange, leaving no Orthodox population since then, but the church continues to appoint titular metropolitans to the see.

The last Roman Catholic holder of the titular see of Myriophytos or Miriofido died in 1932, and the see has been suppressed.

Agriculture 
The coastline between Tekirdağ and Şarköy, particularly Mürefte, are notable centers for viticulture and winemaking. A well-known wine producer, "Kutman", is located in the village, and maintains a wine museum also.

Notable people
Aristotelis Kourtidis (1858 – 1928), Greek educator and writer.
Vasilis Logothetidis (1897 - 1960), Greek actor.

References

Sources 
  The entry cites:
Drakos, Thrakika (in Greek, Athens, 1892), 72-93.
 
 

 
Catholic titular sees in Europe
Fishing communities in Turkey
Populated coastal places in Turkey
Former Greek towns in Turkey
Villages in Şarköy District